Blue LoLãn, also known as Blu, is an American artist, animal activist, director, cinematographer, model, actor, musician, editor, animator, graphic designer, and photographer.

Life and work 
LoLãn starred in her first role in a Tom Petty music video with Luke Wilson and Robin Tunney. She has worked with directors Paul Thomas Anderson and John Hilcoat.

LoLãn has worked on videos for Apple, Facebook, and Pharrell.

LoLãn also performs as character Cindy Savalas, singing Italo disco, pop, shoegaze, and acting as Cindy, with vocals on the album, Memories of Cindy, and a Solo Album titled I'm Cindy.

LoLãn has been featured in magazines such as Elle Girl, Honey, Uniqlo’s first ever LifeWear Magazine, and more.

LoLãn is an animal activist, who has rescued several wild animals, such as deer, and is creating a documentary about it.

A campaign LoLãn directed in 2019 was nominated for a Webby Award.

Discography 
 Another
 2Y & 6M
 My Mother
 Never Let Me Go
 New Power
  Cousins Birthday Party
 Seaview Parking
 Justin
 Mary
 Boyfriend
 I Love You
 Voice Message
  Maybe Because Its Over Now
 I Feel Everything
 Pure Tibet
 ALOHAnet
 Seventeen
 RTL Unifeeder
 Peter Accepts Death
 Pyrotechnomarco
 Forever Afsluitdijk
 IAO Industries video
 Transportzone Meer
 Dancing & Crying
 Ultimate Lovestory Fantasy
 Wilco's Funeral
 Teleac
 Disappointment Island
 Fat Director
 Cyber Tears
 Are You Friends With Amber?
 Can It Be
 145
 Dreams Always Come Thru
 Messed It Up

References

Year of birth missing (living people)
Living people
American film directors
American women pop singers
American women rock singers
American child actresses
American activists
American performance artists
American digital artists
Animal rescuers
21st-century American women